Dean Ruben James (born 30 April 2000) is a Dutch professional footballer who plays as a left-back for FC Volendam.

References

2000 births
Living people
Dutch footballers
FC Volendam players
Tweede Divisie players
Eerste Divisie players
Association football defenders